Our Crazy Nieces is a 1963 Austrian comedy film directed by Rolf Olsen and starring Gunther Philipp, Vivi Bach, and Paul Hörbiger. It was the second part in a trilogy of films which began with Our Crazy Aunts in 1961 and finished with Our Crazy Aunts in the South Seas.

The film's sets were designed by the art director Wolf Witzemann. It was shot at the Sievering Studios in Vienna.

Cast

References

Bibliography

External links 
 

1963 films
1963 musical comedy films
Austrian musical comedy films
1960s German-language films
Films directed by Rolf Olsen
Austrian sequel films
Cross-dressing in film
Constantin Film films
Films shot at Sievering Studios